Heather Lynn Williams (born February 3, 1976 née Holder) is an American singer-songwriter born and raised in Dearborn, Michigan. In 2011 Williams released the album entitled This Time Around, her first full-length studio album that was with the record label Fair Trade Services.

Background
Williams was raised in a poor, abusive home by her step-father and birth mother until she was 11, when her mother gave her away. Williams married Timothy Blair Williams in August 1995 in Stuart, Florida, and the couple's eldest son died at the age of six months. However, Williams subsequently gave birth to four healthy boys.

Discography

Albums

Singles

References

External links
 

1976 births
Living people
21st-century American singers
American women singer-songwriters
American performers of Christian music
Fair Trade Services artists
Singer-songwriters from Michigan
People from Dearborn, Michigan
People from Stuart, Florida
Singer-songwriters from Florida
21st-century American women singers